The Myanmar Scout Association (formerly known as the Union of Burma Boy Scouts) is the national Scouting organization in Myanmar. Scouting in Myanmar was started in 1916 and disbanded in 1964 due to country's political changes; the current organization was formed in 2012 under the supervision and support of the Ministry of Education of Myanmar and became a member of the World Organization of the Scout Movement on 11 August 2016. It has about 21,007 members.

History
Scouting was founded in Burma as part of the British Indian branch of The Scout Association during the colonial period, introduced in 1910 for British dependents. By 1913, Lone Scouts were found in Burma. Later, Scouting was opened to the Burmese. In 1922, Burmese Scouting became a separate branch of the British headquarters in London, but shared the same Chief Scout as India, the Viceroy.

World War II
In Hilary Saint George Saunders' The Left Handshake, written in 1948:

Postwar Scouting

Upon independence, the Union of Burma Boy Scouts was recognized in the spring of 1948. It was one of the founding National Scout Organizations of the Far East Regional Scout Conference. Because of the war and its aftermath, Scouting had almost disappeared, but former Scouters and Old Scouts made strenuous efforts to revive it.

J. S. Wilson, Director of the Boy Scouts International Bureau, visited Burma in 1952. Wilson's sole journey outside Rangoon was to fly to Myaungmya in the Irrawaddy Delta. Scouting in that district was due to the enthusiasm of a Gurkha Preventive Officer, who formed all the official and influential men in the town into a Local Association. Many of those auxiliary leaders were given preliminary Scout training. Scouters and Guiders received more intensive training, while he apprenticed a successor as District Commissioner. Wilson met Bluebirds and Guides, Cubs and Scouts at a refugee village rapidly becoming a cooperative settlement; Guides and Scouts in their own locale; as well as a little band of Scouts in the compound of a Buddhist monastery across the river.

Burma sent a representative to the 1957 Far East Scouters' Regional Pow-Wow held at Sutton Park, England. By 1959 the nation counted 13,889 members, and the University of Rangoon in 1960 hosted the Second Far East Regional Scout Conference, with the First Far East Professional Scouters Training Conference held at Inyale Camp in Rangoon as an ancillary event. Tin Tun represented UBBS in the five-man Far East Scout Advisory Committee (FESAC). Burma's Ba Htay was elected one of the earliest chairmen of FESAC, which would later become the Asia-Pacific Region, and served from 1958 to 1960. Boy and Girl Scouts in Burma merged in 1962 to form the coeducational Union of Burma Boy Scouts and Girl Guides, which was active until 1964, reaching a membership high-point of 93,562.

Youth program
Aside from the traditional UBBS scheme for training youth in patrols and troops, the visibility of Scouting in the urban and rural communities consisted of citywide Cleaning Week campaigns, "Safety-on-the-Road" services, and Cub Scout rallies at Rangoon's Inyale Training Center. Scouts' Day was celebrated every January 1 in Rangoon. In 1958, UBBS published the Handbook for Patrol Leaders in the Burmese language.

Adult training
The UBBS conducted a series of intensive training in the five regions of the country. In addition to the Cub Scout and Scout leaders' basic training courses, a Wood Badge course was conducted by John Thurman, Camp Chief of Gilwell Park in 1962.

Scout Motto
The Scout Motto was    asin athint, translated "Always Prepared".

Disbandment
Democratic rule ended in 1962 when General Ne Win led a military coup d'état. Almost all aspects of society (business, media, production) were nationalized or brought under government control (including the Boy Scouts). On 1 March 1964, the Union of Burma Revolutionary Council (the ruling military junta at the time) dissolved the UBBS, Lieutenant Ye Htoon, the Director General of UBBSGG reported. The assets of the association were turned over to the Ministry of Education, which was authorized to form its Lansin Lu-nge Aphwe (Programme Youth Organization), the youth wing of the Burma Socialist Programme Party. Girl Guiding was not immediately outlawed, and the standalone Union of Burma Girl Guides Association remained a member of the World Association of Girl Guides and Girl Scouts, and was last mentioned by WAGGGS in 1969. In the decades following, Scouting units existed underground and the firm believers of the Principles of Scouting continued the programme. This was evident when the regional team met old Scouts who continued the same Scouting methods. This is further manifested by the existence of their Scouting manuals, records and, uniform.

Re-establishment
The Government of the Republic of the Union of Myanmar ordered the Ministry of Education to found the Myanmar Scouts Association in 2012, and students' Scouts Associations were founded in 20 schools as of December 2020.

Work at rebirth
According to Eric Khoo Heng-Pheng of the World Organization of the Scout Movement, "We hope to work on (Laos and Burma) again... Laos is the closest, as we have got Cambodia in already... Just like Vietnam... we are working with them through ASEAN Scouting. We hope to enroll all the countries including China in (the Asia-Pacific Scout Region)." Approval was given to restart December 25, 2012. Since the first visit of APR in 2012, the membership of Myanmar Scout had grown from 2,000 to approximately 25,000. The Myanmar government approved the legal registration and Constitution of Myanmar Scout. The Constitutions Committee, on behalf of the World Scout Committee, confirmed that all requirements of WOSM membership under Chapter III, Article V have been fulfilled.

Motto and slogan 

See also

The Bharat Scouts and Guides
Bangladesh Scouts
Pakistan Boy Scouts Association
Edward Michael Law-Yone

References

Scouting 'Round the World, John S. Wilson, first edition, Blandford Press 1959
Facts on World Scouting, Boy Scouts International Bureau, Ottawa, Canada, 1961
The Left Handshake, Hilary Saint George Saunders, 1948
Forty Years and Beyond published by the Asia-Pacific Regional Scout Office, 1997, provided by Ms. Arjay C. Francisco, Secretary, Youth Program and IT and Adult Resources and Research, WOSM Asia-Pacific Region
 World Association of Girl Guides and Girl Scouts, World Bureau (1997), Trefoil Round the World. Eleventh Edition 1997. 

Youth organisations based in Myanmar
World Organization of the Scout Movement member organizations
Scouting and Guiding in Myanmar
Organizations established in 2012
2012 establishments in Myanmar